Events from the year 1848 in China.

Incumbents 
 Daoguang Emperor (28th year)

Viceroys
 Viceroy of Zhili — Nergingge
 Viceroy of Min-Zhe — Wang Yide
 Viceroy of Huguang — Yutai
 Viceroy of Shaan-Gan — ?
 Viceroy of Liangguang — Qiying
 Viceroy of Yun-Gui — Lin Zexu, Lin Xingyuan
 Viceroy of Sichuan — Qishan
 Viceroy of Liangjiang — Li Xingyuan

Events 
 In January 1848, God-Worshipping Society leader Feng Yunshan was arrested and banished to Guangdong by local authorities 
 January — California Gold Rush starts as gold discovered at Sutters mill. Inspires thousands of Chinese to travel to America to search for gold
 The first horse race is organized in Shanghai (see Shanghai Race Club)
 Roman Catholic Archdiocese of Guangzhou established

Births 
 Sun Yirang (Chinese: 孫詒讓; pinyin: Sūn Yíràng) (1848–1908) philologist, scholar of the Mozi
 Cheng Tinghua (程廷華) (1848–1900) was a renowned master of Chinese Neijia (internal) martial art Bagua Zhang.

References